Poet Mashiur Rahman Rahman may refer to:

 Mashiur Rahman (politician from Jessore) (1920–1971), Bangladeshi lawyer and politician
 Mashiur Rahman (politician from Rangpur) (1924–1979), Bangladeshi minister
 Mashiur Rahman (adviser), Bangladesh Awami League politician

See also 
 Mashiur Rahaman Ranga, Bangladeshi politician from Rangpur.